Rheinheimera gaetbuli is a Gram-negative, rod-shaped, strictly aerobic and motile bacterium from the genus of Rheinheimera which has been isolated from tidal flat sediments from the Jeju Island in Korea.

References 

Chromatiales
Bacteria described in 2017